Grieb is a surname. Notable people with the surname include:

A. Katherine Grieb, American theologian
John Grieb (1879–1939), American gymnast and track and field athlete
Manfred H. Grieb (1933-2012), American-German entrepreneur and art collector
Mark Grieb (born 1974), American football quarterback
Walter Grieb (1911-?), Swiss boxer

de:Grieb